is a passenger railway station in located in the city of Kishiwada, Osaka Prefecture, Japan, operated by West Japan Railway Company (JR West).

Lines

Station layout
The station consists of two opposed side platforms connected to the station building by a footbridge. The station has a Midori no Madoguchi staffed ticket office.

Platforms

Adjacent stations

|-
!colspan=5|JR West

History
Kumeda Station opened on 16 June 1930. With the privatization of the Japan National Railways (JNR) on 1 April 1987, the station came under the aegis of the West Japan Railway Company.

Station numbering was introduced in March 2018 with Kumeda being assigned station number JR-R38.

Passenger statistics
In fiscal 2019, the station was used by an average of 6,613 passengers daily (boarding passengers only).

Surrounding Area
 Kumeda-dera
 Kaibukiyama Kofun (Morozuka)
 Kishiwada City Kumeda Junior High School
 Kishiwada City Yagi Elementary School
 Kishiwada City Yagiminami Elementary School
 Kumeda Hospital

See also
List of railway stations in Japan

References

External links

 Kumeda Station Official Site

Railway stations in Osaka Prefecture
Railway stations in Japan opened in 1930
Kishiwada, Osaka